Thibaudia is a genus of flowering plants in the family Ericaceae. They are native to Central and South America with a high concentration of species in the cloud forests of Costa Rica and Ecuador. Species of the genus are known commonly as zagalitas.

There are about 60 to 75 species.

Species include:

 Thibaudia acacioides
 Thibaudia albiflora
 Thibaudia andrei
 Thibaudia angustifolia
 Thibaudia anomala
 Thibaudia apophysata
 Thibaudia archeri
 Thibaudia ardisiifolia
 Thibaudia biflora
 Thibaudia breweri
 Thibaudia cardenasii
 Thibaudia cardiophylla
 Thibaudia carrenoi
 Thibaudia caulialata
 Thibaudia clivalis
 Thibaudia costaricensis
 Thibaudia densiflora
 Thibaudia diphylla
 Thibaudia engleriana
 Thibaudia falconensis
 Thibaudia fallax
 Thibaudia floribunda
 Thibaudia gunnarii
 Thibaudia harlingii
 Thibaudia inflata
 Thibaudia insignis
 Thibaudia jahnii
 Thibaudia jorgensenii
 Thibaudia lanata
 Thibaudia lugoi
 Thibaudia macrocalyx
 Thibaudia martiniana
 Thibaudia mellifera
 Thibaudia nervosa
 Thibaudia parvifolia
 Thibaudia pennellii
 Thibaudia rigidiflora
 Thibaudia sessiliflora
 Thibaudia smithiana
 Thibaudia spathulata
 Thibaudia steyermarkii
 Thibaudia tomentosa
 Thibaudia truncata
 Thibaudia ulei
 Thibaudia uniflora
 Thibaudia urbaniana

References

Vaccinioideae
Ericaceae genera